Rosenkopf is a municipality in Südwestpfalz district, in Rhineland-Palatinate, western Germany.

On June 12, 2011, a document surfaced that most likely points to Rosenkopf as the first German town to grant Adolf Hitler honorary citizenship (July 22, 1932), not Bad Doberan, which had been generally confirmed as the town with that distinction.

References

Municipalities in Rhineland-Palatinate
Südwestpfalz